Kallar Syedan (Punjabi/) is a city located in Punjab, Pakistan, and is the headquarters of the Kallar Syedan Tehsil.

History 

Kallar Syedan's existence dates back approximately 1,200 years. The town rose to prominence during Sikh rule, evident today from the havelis (townhouses), gurdwaras (temples) and small fortresses that can be found around the Rawalpindi district. Krishna Temple is an example of a Hindu temple built during Sikh rule.

The Bedi Mahal palace was built by Baba Khem Singh Bedi in the latter half of the 19th century. According to records, Baba Khem Singh assisted the British Raj in suppressing a rebellion in Gugera, a town near the Okara district during the 1857 Indian mutiny. In recognition of his services, he was appointed magistrate in 1877 and was later nominated to the Viceroy's Legislative Council in 1893. After the division of India and Pakistan, the palace was transformed into a boy's high school named Kallar Syedan.

Transport

Road 
Kallar Syedan is located on the N-38 Kallar Suedan Road from Rawalpindi to Azad Kashmir. Kallar Sayyidan Road links the east of the city to Choha Khalsa and Dadyal Tehsil of Azad Kashmir. Kallar SyedanBypass is a newly built road south of the city.

Bus and minibus 
Local services also provide extensive bus and van routes around the local towns, and smaller shuttles travel around the villages in the surrounding area. There are also services to Rawalpindi and Islamabad.

Palala syedan 
 Dhamali 
 Bedi Mahal
Sangni Fort
Pharwala Fort
 Dhan Gali

Notable people

 Tikka Khan
 Abdul Aziz Mirza
 Khem Singh Bedi

References 

 Populated places in Kallar Syedan Tehsil
 Populated places in Rawalpindi District
 Cities in Rawalpindi District